Milheeze (dialect: Millus) is a village in the Dutch province North Brabant. Milheeze is part of the municipality Gemert-Bakel.

The village was first mentioned in 1332 as Milleis. The etymology is unclear. Milheeze developed in the Late Middle Ages around a chapel. The chapel was replaced by the St Willibrordus Church in 1844-1845 which was built on the foundations of the chapel.

Milheeze was home to 579 people in 1840. The monastery Mariaoord was founded in Milheeze in 1935. The village was part of the municipality Bakel en Milheeze until 1966 when it was merged into Gemert-Bakel.

Gallery

References 

Populated places in North Brabant
Gemert-Bakel